Simone  Inguanez (born 3 December 1971) is a Maltese author and poet. She is the eldest of 3 siblings. Born in Bormla, she went on to live with her family in Santa Lucija. She now lives in Kalkara.
 
She qualified from the University of Malta, with a degree in law, forensics and psychology.

In 2005 she published her book Ftit Mara, Ftit Tifla. Inguanez forms part of a number of literary groups and societies, and is well known in the local literary sphere.

She currently holds the position of Diversity and Communities Associate on the Arts Council Malta board.

Publications 
 Water, Earth, Fire and I, 2005
 Ftit Mara, Ftit Tifla, 2005

References 

1971 births
Living people
21st-century Maltese poets
Maltese women poets
21st-century Maltese women writers
University of Malta alumni
People from Cospicua
English-language writers from Malta